HMS Stonehenge was an S-class submarine of the third batch built for the Royal Navy during World War II. Completed in 1943, she made her initial patrol off Norway and was then transferred to the Far East, where she conducted two war patrols, during which she sank two Japanese ships. On her second patrol, Stonehenge disappeared with all hands and was declared overdue on 20 March 1944. The most probable cause of her sinking is that she hit a mine, but her wreck has never been found.

Design and description

The S-class submarines were designed to patrol the restricted waters of the North Sea and the Mediterranean Sea. The third batch was slightly enlarged and improved over the preceding second batch of the S class. They displaced  on the surface and  submerged. The S-class submarines had a crew of 48 officers and ratings.

For surface running, the boats were powered by two  diesel engines, each driving one propeller shaft. When submerged each propeller was driven by a  electric motor. They could reach  on the surface and  underwater.

The boats were armed with seven 21-inch (533 mm) torpedo tubes. A half-dozen of these were in the bow, and one external tube was mounted in the stern. They carried six reload torpedoes for the bow tubes for a total of thirteen torpedoes. Twelve mines could be carried in lieu of the internally stowed torpedoes. They were also armed with a 3-inch (76 mm) deck gun. It is uncertain if Stonehenge was completed with a  Oerlikon light AA gun or had one added later. The third-batch S-class boats were fitted with either a Type 129AR or 138 ASDIC system and a Type 291 or 291W early-warning radar.

Construction and career
HMS Stonehenge was a third-group S-class submarine and was ordered as part of the 1941 Naval Programme on 3 August 1941. She was laid down in the Cammell Laird shipyard in Birkenhead on 4 April 1942 and launched on 23 March 1943. On 12 June 1943, Stonehenge, under the command of Lieutenant  David S. M. Verschoyle-Campbell, sailed to Holy Loch, where she was commissioned into the Royal Navy three days later. Stonehenge was named after the prehistoric monument of Stonehenge and was the second Royal Navy ship with this name.

After training in several port areas, Stonehenge departed Lerwick on 10 September 1943 to patrol off Norway. She ended her patrol two weeks later without having sighted any ships. The boat then departed Great Britain on 5 November and visited Gibraltar, Beirut, and Port Said, then transited the Suez Canal, stopping at Aden and Colombo before arriving at Trincomalee, Ceylon, on 23 January 1944.

On 1 February, Stonehenge departed Trincomalee for her second war patrol. Four days later, she fired two torpedoes at the Japanese merchant ship Koryo Maru No.2, but the torpedoes passed underneath the ship; the submarine surfaced and sank the vessel with her deck gun. On 7 February, the boat launched a landing party at Lem Hua Krung Yai, Siam, then torpedoed and sank the Japanese minelayer Choko Maru west of Malaya five days later. Stonehenge ended her patrol on 18 February.

Loss
On 25 February 1944, Stonehenge left port to patrol north of the Strait of Malacca and off the Nicobar Islands in the Indian Ocean. She never returned from her patrol, and was declared overdue on 20 March. It is considered likely that she hit a mine, although an accident may also have been the cause of her loss. Her wreck has never been found.

Summary of raiding history

Notes

References
 
  
 
 

 

British S-class submarines (1931)
Missing submarines of World War II
1943 ships
World War II shipwrecks in the Indian Ocean
Lost submarines of the United Kingdom
World War II submarines of the United Kingdom
Ships built on the River Mersey
Ships lost with all hands
Maritime incidents in March 1944
Ships sunk by mines